Ola Teigen (11 February 1937 – 28 July 1970) was a Norwegian politician for the Labour Party.

He was born in Ankenes.

He served as a deputy representative to the Norwegian Parliament from Nordland during the term 1965–1969. On the local level he was a member of Oslo city council during the term 1963–1967.

From 1964 to 1969 he was the leader of the Workers' Youth League, the youth wing of the Labour Party. He resigned amid a controversy regarding contact with the Central Intelligence Agency, which contributed to his suicide the next year after battling mental illness.

References 
 

1937 births
1970 deaths
Members of the Storting
Nordland politicians
Politicians from Oslo
Labour Party (Norway) politicians
Norwegian politicians who committed suicide
Suicides in Norway
20th-century Norwegian politicians